The Tallahassee Fire Department provides fire protection and Advanced life support first-response emergency medical services to the city of Tallahassee, Florida and Leon County. The department dates back to 1902, when the first fire department was established by the city. However, some fire protection service existed before that; in 1872 the Colored Hook and Ladder Company responded to the fire which destroyed Lincoln Academy, after the white company, citing "insufficient hoses", refused to respond.

Today TFD has 16 Fire stations serving approximately  incorporated and unincorporated land in Tallahassee as well as parts of Leon County with over 278,000 residents. The department is staffed by 267 certified firefighters and responds to over 30,000 incidents annually.

Stations and apparatus 
The TFD has 16 stations spread out across the city and split into 3 battalions.

Historical photo gallery

References

Fire departments in Florida
Organizations based in Tallahassee, Florida
Government of Tallahassee, Florida
1902 establishments in Florida